Stella Southern was an Australian actress best known for her performances in the silent films A Girl of the Bush (1921) and The Bushwhackers (1925).

Originally from Sydney, she was working for a milliner when discovered by Beaumont Smith who cast her in The Man from Snowy River (1920). He let her select her own stage name (her real name was Lucy Emma "Billie" Winks) 
and she chose "Stella Southern" which means "star of the south".

On 4 October 1921 she married New Zealand film director Harrington Reynolds in Auckland; she had starred for him in The Birth of New Zealand (1921). She also appeared in a number of productions on stage in Brisbane.

Select Credits
The Man from Snowy River (1920) – film
The Betrayer (1921) – film
A Girl of the Bush (1921) – film
The Birth of New Zealand (1921) – film
A Rough Passage (1922) – film
Potash and Perlnutter (1922) – play, Theatre Royal, Brisbane
The Passing of the Third Floor Back (1923) – play, Theatre Royal, Brisbane
The Bachelor's Honeymoon (1923) – play, Theatre Royal, Brisbane
Penelope by Somerset Maugham (1924) – play, His Majesty's, Brisbane
Mrs Dot (1924) – play, His Majesty's Brisbane
Twelfth Night by William Shakespeare (1924) – play, Brisbane
The Bushwhackers (1925) – film
Odds On (1928) – film

References

External links
Stella Southern at National Film and Sound Archive

Year of birth missing
Year of death missing
20th-century Australian actresses